Oan or OAN may refer to:

People
 Oan Djorkaeff (born 1997), French professional footballer
 Oan Ali Mohammed, DRFLA leader killed during the 1980 Iranian Embassy siege

Observatories
National Astronomical Observatory (Chile), owned and operated by the University of Chile
Spanish National Observatory, an astronomical observatory with several facilities in the Madrid area

Organizations
 One America News Network (also: One America News), a far-right news and opinion channel
 Open Access Network, an organization that encourages partnerships between scholarly societies, research libraries, and other institutional partners
 Oxford Archaeology North, a unit of the British archaeology and heritage practice Oxford Archaeology

Other uses
 El Arrayán Airport (IATA code: OAN), an airport serving the city of Olanchito in Yoro Department, Honduras
 Guardians of the Universe, using the demonym Oan, an extra terrestrial race from the planet Oa in the DC Comics universe
 , name for the Japanese era used in the Northern Court for the years 1368–1375
 Open-access network, horizontally layered network architectures in telecommunications and the business model
 Orthodoxy, Autocracy, and Nationality, a doctrine of Tsar Nicholas I

See also